Donald MacDonald may refer to:
Donald MacDonald (army officer) (c. 1724–1760), Scottish military officer who saw service for France, Charles Edward Stuart, and Great Britain
Donald Alexander Macdonald (1817–1896), Canadian politician and lieutenant governor of Ontario
Donald Macdonald (minister) (1825–1901), founding minister of the Free Presbyterian Church of Scotland
Donald Alexander Macdonald (general) (1845–1920), Canadian general
Donald MacDonald (stained glass) (1841–1916), American stained glass artist
Donald MacDonald (pastoralist) (1857–1937), Australian pastoralist
Donald Alaster Macdonald (1859–1932), Australian sports journalist and war correspondent
 Donald MacDonald known as Dòmhnall Ruadh Chorùna (1887–1967), North Uist stonemason and war poet in the Scottish Gaelic language
Donald MacDonald (actor) (1886–1972), American film actor and film director

Donald MacDonald (Nova Scotia politician) (1909–1986), Canadian politician, social democrat and trade unionist
Donald C. MacDonald (1913–2008), Canadian politician, leader of the Ontario New Democratic Party and its predecessor the Ontario Co-operative Commonwealth Federation
Donald Forrest MacDonald (born 1937), politician in Saskatchewan, Canada
Donald MacDonald (Saskatchewan politician)
Donald Stone Macdonald (1919–1993), American academic who specialised in Korean studies
Donald Stovel Macdonald (1932–2018), Canadian politician and cabinet minister in the government of Pierre Trudeau
Donald MacDonald (rugby union) (born 1951), Scottish rugby player
Donald Macdonald (Australian politician) (1886–1962), Australian politician and clergyman
Donald A. MacDonald, Canadian farmer, member of the Prince Edward Island legislature, 1879–1882
Don MacDonald, Canadian politician, member of the Alberta Legislature, 1992–1993
Don Macdonald (?–1994), Australian rugby league referee
Donald MacDonald (preacher) (1825–1901), Scottish preacher
Sir Donald Gorme Og Macdonald, 1st Baronet (died 1643)
Donald Balloch MacDonald (died c. 1476)
Donald Gorm MacDonald of Carey (died 1586)

See also
Donald McDonald (disambiguation)